The Catholic Church in Puerto Rico is part of the worldwide Catholic Church in communion with the Pope in Rome. The 78 municipalities in Puerto Rico have a Catholic Church which is located in the downtown area, normally across from the central plaza.

History
In Puerto Rico, the founding of a town (or municipio) very much depended on the building of a church, a town hall, a butcher's shop and a cemetery. The citizens of the town constructed and decorated the church. As was customary in Spain, in Puerto Rico, the municipality has a barrio called pueblo until it was called barrio-pueblo in 1990 by the US Census. The barrio-pueblo of a municipio contains a central plaza, the municipal buildings (city hall), and a Catholic church. 

It is near the church, which fronts the town's plaza, that Fiestas patronales (patron saint festivals) are held in every year. The Laws of the Indies, Spanish law, which regulated life in Puerto Rico in the early 19th century, stated the plaza's purpose was for "the parties" (celebrations, festivities), and that the square was to be proportionally large enough for the number of neighbors. These Spanish regulations also stated that the streets nearby should be comfortable portals for passersby, protecting them from the elements: sun and rain. The church buildings themselves have been restored many times over the years and are an important part of Puerto Rico's architectural history.

During Puerto Rico's transition from Spanish rule to United States rule in the late 19th century and early 20th century, the Roman Catholic Church laid claim to many properties located in Puerto Rico.  An agreement was reached and a payment of $180,000 was made in three equal installments to the Roman Catholic Church for the properties.  Juan Perpiña y Pibernat was the priest who presided over the church in Puerto Rico during that time of transition. Henry K. Carroll, Special Commissioner for the United States studied the situation in Puerto Rico and reported back that up until then, black clerics had been prohibited by Spain. Further analysis by Samuel Silva Gotay says that the church had chosen to ally with the hacienda owners more than with the common people before, during and after slavery had been abolished.

Present situation

The CIA World Factbook reports that 85% of the population of Puerto Rico is Catholic, with the remaining 15% divided among Protestantism, Islam, and Judaism. However, the CIA report provides no date or source for the data; it may be outdated. Some sources, including Pew Research Center, put the Catholic percentage at approximately 70%.
An Associated Press article in March 2014 stated that "more than 70 percent of whom identify themselves as Catholic" but provided no source for this information (they may have used the 2010 Pew Research data).

However, in a November 2014 report, with the sub-title Widespread Change in a Historically Catholic Region, Pew Research indicated that only 56% of Puerto Ricans were Catholic and that 33% were Protestant; this survey was completed between October 2013 and February 2014.

When discussing Catholicism in Puerto Rico, Archbishop Roberto Gonzalez Nieves of San Juan offered this comment in 2007. "Its deepest roots are Latino ... U.S. rule began in 1898, at the end of the Spanish–American War, but indigenous, African and Spanish cultures "shaped its identity for 400 years" and that influence "cannot be undone overnight”. The shift from Spanish to U.S. rule brought a wave of anti-Catholic sentiment that led to the prohibition of the processions that are a mainstay of Latin American religious practice, as well as government policies that prohibited schools from teaching in Spanish. Since the approval of the Puerto Rican Constitution in 1952, popular religious traditions such as processions and festivals honoring communities' patron saints have taken root again.

There is also a Byzantine Catholic community of the St. Spyridon Parish in Trujillo Alto under the jurisdiction of Archbishop Roberto González Nieves.

List of dioceses
Archdiocese of San Juan de Puerto Rico
 Diocese of Arecibo
 Diocese of Caguas
 Diocese of Mayagüez
 Diocese of Ponce
 Diocese of Fajardo-Humacao – erected March 2008

Individual churches

Municipality parishes

The following are the names of the 78 municipality Catholic parish churches in Puerto Rico:
Adjuntas- Parroquia San Joaquín 
Aguada- Parroquia San Francisco de Asís
Aguadilla- Parroquia San Carlos Borromeo
Aguas Buenas- Parroquia Los Tres Santos Reyes
Aibonito- Parroquia San José
Añasco- Parroquia San Antonio Abad
Arecibo- Catedral San Felipe Apostol
Arroyo- Parroquia Nuestra Señora del Carmen
Barceloneta- Parroquia Nuestra Señora del Carmen
Barranquitas- Parroquia San Antonio de Padua
Bayamón- Parroquia Invención de la Cruz
Cabo Rojo- Parroquia San Miguel Arcángel
Caguas- Catedral Dulce Nombre de Jesús
Camuy- Parroquia San José
Canóvanas- Parroquia Nuestra Señora del Pilar
Carolina- Parroquia San Fernando
Cataño- Parroquia Nuestra Señora del Carmen
Cayey- Parroquia Nuestra Señora de la Asunción
Ceiba- Parroquia San Antonio de Padua
Ciales- Parroquia Nuestra Señora del Rosario
Cidra- Parroquia Nuestra Señora del Carmen
Coamo- Parroquia San Blas de Illescas
Comerío- Parroquia Santo Cristo de la Salud
Corozal- Parroquia La Sagrada Familia
Culebra- Parroquia Nuestra Señora del Carmen
Dorado- Parroquia San Antonio de Padua
Fajardo- Concatedral Santiago Apóstol
Florida- Parroquia Nuestra Señora de la Merced
Guánica- Parroquia San Antonio Abad
Guayama- Parroquia San Antonio de Padua
Guayanilla- Parroquia Inmaculada Concepción
Guaynabo- Parroquia San Pedro Mártir
Gurabo- Parroquia San José
Hatillo- Parroquia Nuestra Señora del Carmen
Hormiqueros- Basílica Menor Nuestra Señora de la Monserrate
Humacao- Concatedral Dulce Nombre de Jesús
Isabela- Parroquia San Antonio de Padua
Jayuya- Parroquia Nuestra Señora de la Monserrate
Juana Díaz- Parroquia San Ramón Nonato
Juncos- Parroquia Inmaculada Concepción
Lajas- Parroquia Nuestra Señora de la Candelaria
Lares- Parroquia San José
Las Marías- Parroquia Inmaculado Corazón de María
Las Piedras- Parroquia Inmaculada Concepción
Loíza- Parroquia Espíritu Santo y San Patricio
Luquillo- Parroquia San José
Manatí- Parroquia Nuestra Señora de la Candelaria y San Matías Apostol
Maricao- Parroquia San Juan Bautista
Maunabo- Parroquia San Isidro Labrador
Mayagüez- Catedral Nuestra Señora de la Candelaria
Moca- Parroquia Nuestra Señora de la Monserrate
Morovis- Parroquia Nuestra Señora del Carmen
Naguabo- Parroquia Nuestra Señora del Rosario
Naranjito- Parroquia San Miguel Arcángel
Orocovis- Parroquia San Juan Bautista
Patillas- Parroquia Inmaculado Corazón de María
Peñuelas- Parroquia San José
Ponce- Catedral Nuestra Señora de la Guadalupe
Quebradillas- Parroquia San Rafael Arcángel
Rincón- Parroquia Santa Rosa de Lima
Río Grande- Parroquia Nuestra Señora del Carmen
Sabana Grande- Parroquia San Isidro Labrador y Santa María de la Cabeza
Salinas- Parroquia Nuestra Señora de la Monserrate
San Germán- Parroquia San Germán de Auxerre
San Juan- Catedral de San Juan Bautista
Catedral Metropolitana Basílica de San Juan Bautista (San Juan, Puerto Rico), San Juan
San Lorenzo- Parroquia Nuestra Señora de las Mercedes
San Sebastián- Parroquia San Sebastián Mártir
Santa Isabel- Parroquia Santiago Apostol
Toa Alta- Parroquia San Fernando Rey
Toa Baja- Parroquia San Pedro Apostol
Trujillo Alto- Parroquia Exaltación de la Santa Cruz
Utuado- Parroquia San Miguel
Vega Alta- Parroquia Inmaculada Concepción
Vega Baja- Parroquia Nuestra Señora del Rosario
Vieques- Parroquia Inmaculada Concepción
Villalba- Parroquia Nuestra Señora del Carmen
Yabucoa- Parroquia Santos Ángeles Custodios
Yauco- Parroquia Santísimo Rosario

Other churches
Iglesia Santa María Reina, in Ponce
Porta Coeli, in San Germán
Church of San Mateo de Cangrejos of Santurce, in Santurce, San Juan
Nuestra Señora de Lourdes Chapel, in Santurce, San Juan
San José Church, in San Juan

Archdiocese of San Juan bankruptcy
On January 11, 2018 Catholic Schools of the Archdiocese of San Juan filed for Chapter 11 bankruptcy, stating that the current pension plan was unworkable and applied for a new plan which has an estimated $10 million in assets and $10 million in liabilities.  On March 27, 2018, local Judge Anthony Cuevas issued an embargo against the Archdiocese of San Juan which would remain in effect until they could find $4.7 million to pay for the teachers pension. It was also ruled that the Catholic Church in Puerto Rico was a single entity and that the embargo would apply to all the suffragan dioceses of the Archdiocese of San Juan.  On August 30, 2018, the Archdiocese of San Juan filed for Chapter 11 bankruptcy, noting that they were unable to find the $4.7 million.  Federal Judge Edward Godoy protected the Archdiocese under Chapter 11, paralyzing the seizure of assets and helping them avoid the owed retirement payments. However, it was also ruled that the bankruptcy would apply to all the other Catholic dioceses in Puerto Rico.

Episcopal conference
The bishops in Puerto Rico form the Puerto Rican Episcopal Conference.
 The episcopal conference allows the bishops to set certain norms for all of Puerto Rico, including the form of the liturgy.

See also
List of the Catholic bishops of the United States

References

External links
Conferencia Episcopal Puertorriqueña (C.E.P.). GCatholic.org website

 
Puerto Rico
Christianity in Puerto Rico